The Climate Policy Initiative (CPI) is an independent non-profit research group and international climate policy organization based in San Francisco, California with other offices worldwide. CPI is supported primarily by philanthropic organizations and government development finance.

With over 100 analysts and advisors the climate think tank works to improve energy and land use policies around the world, with a particular focus on finance. It is considered a leader expert group in tracking global climate finance.
Beginning with the Landscape of Climate Finance (2011), CPI has published a series of annual reports which examine both public and private financial flows worldwide. CPI also publishes in-depth case studies on the public sector's mobilization of private
investment. 
As of 2021, CPI reported that flows of climate-related finance in and between countries account for only about 0.7% of the world’s GDP, far below the amount that is projected to be needed for climate mitigation and adaptation. The San Giorgio Group (SGG), a working group established by CPI and others in 2011, focuses on ways in which financing can support green low-emissions investment.

The Climate Policy Initiative should not to be confused with Initiative on Climate Change policy and Governance (ICCG), formerly (up to 2017) International Center for Climate Governance.

History
Founded in 2009 by Thomas Heller,
CPI is headquartered in San Francisco (United States). It also has offices in Rio de Janeiro (Brazil), New Delhi (India), Jakarta (Indonesia), and London (United Kingdom).
As of 2020, the Global Managing Director of the Climate Policy Institute is Barbara Buchner.

Current fields of research
 Renewable energy & energy efficiency
 Policy & institutions
 Carbon finance
 Climate & development (for the scientific journal see Climate and Development)
 Forestry & land use

Publications
CPI has published about 200 studies on the previously listed fields of research, mainly in English, with some in Portuguese and Bahasa Indonesia (Malay). The studies are freely downloadable in its publications web page.

See also
 Climate Finance
 Global warming

External links
 Climate Policy Initiative official website

References

Environmental research institutes
Climate change

Environmental organizations
Economic research institutes
Nonpartisan organizations in the United States
Political and economic think tanks in the United States
Non-profit organizations based in San Francisco
Natural resource management
Organizations established in 2009